Pasuquin, officially the Municipality of Pasuquin,  is a 3rd class municipality in the province of Ilocos Norte, Philippines. According to the 2020 census, it has a population of 29,678 people.

Pasuquin is a farming and fishing area. As of the mid-1990s, the principal local crops were rice, for home consumption, and garlic, much of which is exported to Taiwan.

Geography 

Barangays 
Pasuquin is politically subdivided into 33 barangays. These barangays are headed by elected officials: Barangay Captain, Barangay Council, whose members are called Barangay Councilors. All are elected every three years.

Climate

Demographics

Economy

Government 
Pasuquin, belonging to the first congressional district of the province of Ilocos Norte, is governed by a mayor designated as its local chief executive and by a municipal council as its legislative body in accordance with the Local Government Code. The mayor, vice mayor, and the councilors are elected directly by the people through an election which is being held every three years.

Elected officials

Municipal seal 

 Shield, derived from the Provincial Seal of Ilocos Norte
 Rice, Fish and Garlic, represent the major sources of income of the municipality
 Salt Making, during off-season, people resort to salt making thereby increasing the income of the townspeople
 Fieldspar Deposit, represent the town's big deposit of fieldspar- a non-metallic mineral.

Culture
Poblacion 2 -  "Rambac ti Daya".
Poblacion 3 - "Ragragsak ti Laud"
Barangay 5: Davila - "Dumadara Festival: Fluvial Parade"
Semana Santa (Holy Week Celebration)
May Flower Festival (where the Sunflower Organization started a worldwide known Pageantry)
Town Fiesta in December from the 26th till the 30th. One of the highlights for the fiesta is the Inter-Barangay Basketball tournament and Inter-Agency Basketball tournament which include all groups of individual all over the town, also Balikbayan team included.
Panagsana Festival
Puyupuyan- Actually, the main attraction should be the old Spanish Tower located behind a grotto some fanatic people built. This fortress was built by the Spaniards as watchtower for some pirates roaming the ocean for their victims. The grotto they alleged to have some apparitions were never verified by either the government or the Church, yet some people believe that the grotto has healed some illness and brought some luck to fishermen. This depends on one's belief.

Panagsana Festival
It is the most known festival in Pasuquin. “Panagsana” is the Ilocano term used for this old-aged occupation. It means salt making, customarily done during summer and became the leading industry among the coastal folks in the municipality. The festival is annually celebrated on December during the town fiesta. Usually celebrated with street dances during the 29th of December, participated by the 8 clustered Barangays. Then, after, a showdown is held showcasing the history, legends,  the beautiful Pasuquin, and the Traditional Salt Making.

The Sunflower Festival
An American film, Sunflowers (1996), directed by Shawn Hainsworth, an Independent U.S. Film Director, has made the Sunflower Festival internationally known. The film garnered critics recognition in the 1997 Chicago Gay and Lesbian Film Festival and other Film festivals in North America.

Sunflower members are also active in participation of the annual town fiesta in December, the Mayflower festivities and religious celebrations like Holy Week. Indeed, they may be gay but they are truly and undoubtedly assets to the community.

The Rambac ti Daya Festival
Poblacion 2 or better known as Dos, with almost 2,000 population annually celebrates the "RAMBAC ti DAYA"  as a feast of thanksgiving to the Almighty Creator for bountiful harvests.. The unpredictable weather makes this event very surprising, as May is known to be the first month of the year with heavy rains..

Started in 1992 through a Municipal Ordinance, Poblacion Dos is known to be the pioneer barangay to come up with a barangay fiesta title-RAMBAC TI DAYA. This festivity culminates on the first two days of May, but usually preceded by an inter-zonal basketball tournament that runs for two to four weeks sponsored by the Sangguniang Kabataan..

One of the highlights of the festival is the community night, in which Barangay residents, local and foreign visitors gather together at the barangay plaza known as "Plaza Murit", for merry-making through community KTV, beer drinking, exchanging goodies, reuniting with good old folk, and simply enjoying and sharing abundant blessings.

The festival ends on the second day of May. A thanksgiving mass is offered in the first hour of the morning, followed by a motorists' parade downtown. After the motorcade, various Palarong Nayon are played by children and adult residents alike, where big prizes are at stake.

At night, the festival ends with a Sagalas/Santa Cruzan, a tribute to Queen Elena on her way to the Holy Cross. The Flores de Mayo parades young kids as they are dressed in their respective personas.

In the Flores De Mayo program, the Gawad Rambac ti Daya, Most Outstanding Anak ti Dos is awarded to the most deserving resident that made great impact and unsurmounted selfless contributions through civil service, social work, religious, and human rights advocacy, and youth and sports development.

The Dumadara Festival

An annual fluvial parade festival started by the Davileneos, particularly the Roman Catholic Parish of St. Francis of Assisi. Davila is a coastal barangay of Pasuquin, and their main harvest is dumadara (a certain fish). They associated the festival to the Blessed Virgin Mary, whom the Month of May is dedicated, as a thanksgiving for a bountiful fishing. Fisherfolks from Davila are made to decorate their bangkas (boats) for the fluvial parade. There are many activities hold also during the festival like boat race, and eating delectable grilled fish (Dumadara)with the guests.

Holy Week Celebration
The coastal town of Pasuquin celebrates its Holy Week with much religiosity and solemnity. The celebration starts on Palm Sunday (Domingo de Ramos) and ends on Easter Sunday (Domingo de Pascua). Each year, townspeople from all walks of life come together to celebrate the Most Holy Passion and Death of our Lord.

There are a total of 3 processions during Holy Week in St. James the Greater Parish, Pasuquin's Roman Catholic Church. The Holy Tuesday procession, better known as "Estacion General", Good Friday (the Holy Burial) and Easter Sunday (the "Encuentro" or "Sabet" in Ilocano). The processional images are enthroned in their respective carozzas with floral arrangements and elaborate lighting fixtures.

During Good Fridays, the "Stabat Mater" in Latin is sung by a long array of "cantoras" (townspeople) following the Santo Entierro (Dead Christ). Pasuquin is the only remaining town in Ilocos that practices this beautiful tradition/heritage handed by its forebears. The singing of the "Stabat Mater" in Pasuquin has been in existence for more than a century.

Attractions

 Davila - Salt Capital;  Also known for its bonsai production & artistry. Home of the "Dumadara Festival" organized by the Roman Catholic Parish of St. Francis of Assisi.
 Estancia- Summer Capital of Pasuquin. Known for its scenic Sexy Beach
 Naglicuan - Botanic Garden of Pasuquin
 Poblacion 2 - Sentinella Hills, Nagrebcan & Magararay Rice Fields, and the existence of the Old Roman Catholic Church Ruins. Home of the "Rambac ti Daya Festival" 
 Poblacion 3 - Barangay "Biscocho", simply for making the best tasting biscochos in the entire province. Home of the "Ragragsak ti Laud Festival"
 Puyupuyan - Known for its grotto and the apparition in the late 80s and early 90s, Puyupuyan is one of the best Summer destinations in the town. With the presence of the ship wrecked believed to have sank during the Second World War, the seashores just made it perfect for tourists for a great souvenir shots
 San Juan -  Known for its summer getaway falls called "Calitungan"
 Santa Matilde - hunting; mango tree production
 Sapat - known for the PAF Airbase and the most restricted area in the town
 Sulbec - known for its Put-tot Siraong Picnic Venues
 Surong - known for its Luttuong falls
 Tadao -  Houses the biggest dam in the municipality. Also good for picnics, trekking and hiking escapades.
 Susugaen - known for its own "Put-tot," a small lake, which many people visit because of its fresh, cold and clear water. Another attraction is the waterfall known as "Saypon" which used to served the villagers with abundance of water along with streams and rivers. "Suso Beach" is also located here. Furthermore, "Villa Florentina Beach Resort" is also situated between Sitio Cababan and Barangay Nalvo at the South-Western part.

References

External links
[ Philippine Standard Geographic Code]
Philippine Census Information
Local Governance Performance Management System

Municipalities of Ilocos Norte